Dizaj-e Talkhaj (also Romanized as Dīzaj-e Talkhāj) is a village in Bozkosh Rural District, in the Central District of Ahar County, East Azerbaijan Province, Iran. At the 2006 census, its population was 36, in 7 families.

References 

Populated places in Ahar County